Trinidad Head Lighthouse is a historic lighthouse in Trinidad, California.

History
The low, square, brick tower, painted white, was built in 1871. Despite the great height above the sea, heavy seas have been known to reach it. A huge wave hit the lighthouse at about 4:40pm local time on the afternoon of 31 December 1913. In 1914, the keeper made the following report:
"At 4:40 p. m. I observed a sea of unusual height. When it struck the bluff the jar was very heavy. The lens immediately stopped revolving. The sea shot up the face of the bluff and over it, until the solid sea seemed to me to be on a level with where I stood in the lantern. The sea itself fell over onto the top of the bluff and struck the tower about on a level with the balcony. The whole point between the tower and the bluff was buried in water."
The wave he described was the highest recorded wave on the coast.
After the sea struck the lighthouse and extinguished the light, service was restored in four hours by Lightkeeper F.L. Harrington, the keeper from 1888 to 1916.

Buildings and structures

The station originally consisted of the small two-story light tower, a single Victorian residence, and a small barn. In 1898, a bell house was constructed, and a  bell was added that was operated by weights. A second keeper was assigned at that time, and the quarters were expanded to accommodate two families. In 1947, the fog signal changed to an air horn. In 1949, the Trinidad Civic Club constructed a facsimile of the tower in a park overlooking the harbor and installed the original lens in its structure as a memorial to those lost or buried at sea. The 4,000-pound bell is displayed alongside the tower. In the late 1960s, the Coast Guard razed the original dwelling and barn and constructed the present triplex. The fog signal was discontinued when the station was automated in 1974. Complaints from the citizens of Trinidad Head were so vocal that the Coast Guard installed the present ELG 300, operated by a fog detector. The new fog signal is operated in the original bell house. The original tower remains essentially unchanged.

The replica building along with the original lens was moved to tribal land at the bottom of the unstable bluff to  prevent possible loss due to erosion.

Head keepers
 Jeremiah Kiler (1871 – 1888)
 William A. Henderson (1888)
 Frederick L. Harrington (1888 – 1916)
 Josephine I. Harrington (1916)
 Edward Wiborg (1916 – at least 1930)
 Malcolm Cady (at least 1932 – 1940)
 Perry S. Hunter (1940 - at least 1946)

National Register listing
The lighthouse was listed as Trinidad Head Light Station on the National Register of Historic Places on September 3, 1991, reference number 91001098. The 1900 fog-signal building is a contributing building, and the 1871 lighthouse tower is listed as a contributing structure. The 1969 keeper's building, which replaced the original keeper's residence, is non-contributing to the listing.

See also
Other historic lighthouses in Humboldt County:
 Punta Gorda Light
 Cape Mendocino Light
 Table Bluff Light

References

External links

Lighthouses completed in 1871
Transportation buildings and structures in Humboldt County, California
Lighthouses on the National Register of Historic Places in California
Historic districts on the National Register of Historic Places in California
National Register of Historic Places in Humboldt County, California
1871 establishments in California